Well-Intended Love (Chinese: 奈何BOSS要娶我) is a 2019 Chinese television series starring Wang Shuang and Xu Kaicheng. The plot revolves around budding D-list actress, Xia Lin (Wang Shuang) who is diagnosed with leukemia. To secure a bone marrow donation, she makes a marriage pact with a handsome, young CEO, Ling Yi Zhou (Xu Kaicheng).

Cast
 Simona Wang as Xia Lin, an aspiring actress who is diagnosed with leukemia. She signs a two-year marriage contract with Ling Yi Zhou.
 Xu Kaicheng as Ling Yi Zhou, the overbearing CEO of Lingshi Group who agrees to donate his bone marrow to Xia Lin in return for her hand in marriage.
 Ian Yi as Chu Yan, a famous actor and Ling Yi Zhou's friend
 Liu Jia Xi as Jia Fei, Xia Lin's best friend and roommate and Wen Li's girlfriend
 Huang Qian Shuo as Wen Li, Ling Yi Zhou's personal assistant and Jia Fei's boyfriend
 Sun Jia Qi as An Ran, Chu Yan's friend as well as Ling Yi Zhou's childhood friend, whom she is in love with (Season 1)
 Kiwi Shang as Yin Shuangshuang, a celebrity figure and Chu Yan's friend
 Yang Hao Ming as Nan Jin Tian, Xia Lin's neighbor and Ling Yi Zhou's step-brother who often conspires with An Ran to make trouble for Xia Lin (Season 1)
 Chen Xin Ru as Yang Tong, Xia Lin's assistant  (Season 1)

Episodes

Season 1 (2019)

Season 2 (2020)

Release
Well-Intended Love was released on January 17, 2019 on Chinese streaming service Sohu. It began streaming on Netflix in May 2019. Season two wrapped production at the end of summer 2019 and was released on Sohu on February 13, 2020. Season two began streaming on Netflix in April 2020 and contains 16 episodes.

Awards and nominations

References

External links
 
 

Mandarin-language television shows
2019 Chinese television series debuts
2019 Chinese television series endings
2019 web series debuts
Chinese web series
Sohu original programming
Chinese romantic comedy television series